Mistress Music is a 1988 reggae album by Burning Spear released by Slash Records.

Track listing
"Tell The Children"
"Leader"
"Woman, I Love You"
"One Way"
"Negril"
"Mistress Music"
"Love Garvey"
"Tell Me, Tell Me"
"Say You Are In Love"
"Fly Me To The Moon"

Credits
All Songs Written By Winston Rodney
Published By Burning Spear Publishing PRS
Executive Producer - A Burning Music Production 18 Hill Street, St. Ann's Bay
Recorded At - Tuff Gong Recording Studios, Kingston, Jamaica
Recording Engineer - Gary Sutherland
Mixed At - Sound Ideas Studio, New York
Mixing Engineers - Michael Sauvage and Mervyn Williams
Assistant - Joe Pirrera
Mastered By - Brian Gardner and Matt Wallace at Grundman Mastering, Los Angeles
Photography - Lendon Flanagan
Illustration - Oscar Moreno
Art Direction - Jeff Price
Very Special Thanks To Robbie Lyn, Rass Brass, Eric Greenspan Esq., Michael Sauvage, and to all "Burning Spear fans"

Musicians
Burning Spear - vocals, harmony
Devon Bradshaw - bass
Nelson Miller - drums
Anthony Bradshaw - guitar, harmony
Lenford Richards - lead guitar
Alvin Haughton - percussion
Jennifer Hill (musician) - saxophone ("Love Garvey" and "Say You Are In Love")
Pamela Fleming - trumpet ("Love Garvey," "Say You Are In Love," and solo on "Fly Me To The Moon")
Nilda Richards - trombone ("Love Garvey" and "Say You Are In Love")
Additional Musicians
Robbie Lyn - synthesizers, piano
Dean Fraser - saxophone
Ronald "Nambo" Robinson - trombone
Junior "Chico" Chin - trumpet
Michael Sauvage - piano ("Mistress Music")

Burning Spear albums
1988 albums
Slash Records albums